Bear arms or right to bear arms may refer to:
 Right to keep and bear arms, the concept that people have a right to own and carry arms
 The law of heraldic arms governing the display of coats of arms
 Right to Bear Arms (Russian organization), a Russian gun rights group founded by Maria Butina

See also
 The Right to Arm Bears, a collection of three science fiction novellas
 The Right to Bare Arms, a comedy album by Larry the Cable Guy
 Gun ownership
 The forelimbs of bears, an aspect of bear morphology